Zettascale computing refers to computing systems capable of calculating at least "1021 IEEE 754 Double Precision (64-bit) operations (multiplications and/or additions) per second (zettaFLOPS)". A zettascale computer system could generate more single floating point data in one second than was stored by the total digital means on Earth in the first quarter of 2011.

Definitions

Floating point operations per second (FLOPS) are one measure of computer performance. FLOPS can be recorded in different measures of precision, however the standard measure (used by the TOP500 supercomputer list) uses 64 bit (double-precision floating-point format) operations per second using the High Performance LINPACK (HPLinpack) benchmark.

Forecasts
In 2018, Chinese scientists predicted that the first zettascale system will be assembled in 2035. This forecast looks plausible from the historical point of view as it took some 12 years to progress from the terascale machines (1012) to petascale systems (1015) and then 14 more years to move to exascale computers (1018). 

Scientists forecast that the zettascale systems are likely to be data-centric; this proposition means that the system components will move to the data, not vice versa, as the data volumes in the future are anticipated to be so large that moving data will be too expensive. It is also forecasted that the zettascale systems are expected to be decentralized—because such a model can be the shortest route to achieving zettascale performance, with millions of less powerful components linked and working together to form a collective hypercomputer that is more powerful than any single machine. Such decentralized systems may be designed to mimick complex biologic systems, and the next cybernetic paradigm may be based on liquid cybernetic systems with embodied intelligence solutions.

Potential configuration
China’s National University of Defense Technology propose the following metrics:
Power consumption: 100 MW
Power efficiency: 10 teraflops/watt
Peak performance per node: 10 petaflops
Communication bandwidth between nodes: 1.6 terabits/second
I/O bandwidth: 10 to 100 petabytes/second
Storage capacity: 1.0 zettabyte
Floor space: 1000 square meters

Problems
As Moore's law nears its natural limits, supercomputing will face serious physical problems to move from exascale to zettascale systems, making the decade after 2020 a vital period to develop key high-performance computing techniques. Many forecasters, including Gordon Moore himself, expect the Moore's law to end by around 2025. Another challenge for reaching zettascale performance can be enormous energy consumption.

Applications
Zettascale computers will be able to accurately forecast the global weather for the period of approximately 2 weeks. 

Zettascale calculations will also be able to significantly reduce the time required for astrophysical simulations of such rare phenomena as black holes, neutron star mergers, and supernovae. For example, the calculating of a 3D model of shock wave instability from a collapsing supernova core, which takes 1 million hours on petaflops computers and 1000 hours on exaflops machines, can be done in just one hour on zettaflops systems.

Zettascale or yottascale systems might be able to accurately model the whole human brain.

See also
Computer performance by orders of magnitude
Exascale computing
Petascale computing
List of hypothetical technologies

References

External links 
Perspectives on High-Performance Computing in a Big Data World
Towards Zettascale Computing on Exascale Platforms

Supercomputing